USS G-3 (SS-31) was a G-class submarine of the United States Navy. While the four G-boats were nominally all of a class, they differed enough in significant details that they are sometimes considered to be four unique boats, each in a class by herself. G-3 was named Turbot when her keel was laid down on 30 March 1911 by the Lake Torpedo Boat Company in Bridgeport, Connecticut, making her the first ship of the United States Navy to be named for the turbot, a large, brown and white flatfish, valued as a food.  She was renamed G-3 on 17 November 1911, transferred to the New York Navy Yard for completion on 17 November 1913 following the cancellation of the Lake contract, launched on 27 December 1913, and commissioned on 22 March 1915.

Service history
After fitting out, G-3 proceeded to Bridgeport, Connecticut on 1 July to have sponsons fitted to the boat to increase stability. During submerged test runs off Port Jefferson in Long Island Sound two weeks later, however, her crew discovered several leaks and the submersible docked at the Lake Company's marine railway for repairs and alterations. These modifications – which included work on the main engine oiling system as well as sponson installation – lasted until 8 January 1916. On that date, she sailed back to the New York Navy Yard to be inclined and undergo a deep submergence test. The latter took place off Eaton's Point, Long Island, on 8 February, with Simon Lake – owner of the Lake Torpedo Boat Company – embarked.

On 11 February, G-3 proceeded to New London, Connecticut, for initial shakedown operations.  Aside from a brief period alongside submarine tender Tonopah (ex-Nevada) to repair damaged screws in March, she spent the next five months conducting trial runs, dive tests and training operations out of New London. Following another yard period at Bridgeport in mid-July to replace defective lube pumps, the boat moved to New York City on 30 August for final acceptance trials. Unfortunately, the breakdown of G-3s port engine disrupted her standardization trials in late September, prompting her move into the Navy Yard for repairs on 3 October. Difficulties in working in tight engine room spaces necessitated removing the port engine for repair and the boat remained immobile through the following spring. She finally put to sea on 1 June 1917 and returned to New London that same day.

Assigned to Division Two (Training and Experimental Division), Submarine Flotilla, Atlantic Fleet, G-3 combined the training of new student crews in submarine operations and torpedo firing with experimental work as needed. The latter included harbor net defense deployment drills with tender  in June and stationary dives with a submarine rescue bell in the Thames River in September.

On 26 April 1918 she ran aground on Eel Grass Shoal near Fishers Island, New York. Refloated and returned to service. In May 1918, G-3 participated in submarine division maneuvers in Great Salt Pond Bay, including several two to five-day cruises at sea. In early June, following warnings of German U-boats off the East Coast, G-3 conducted a number of periscope and listening patrols in the region. These operations came to a sudden end on 13 June, when engine and battery trouble forced the boat to sail to New York for spare parts. Returning to New London on 18 June, G-3 underwent an availability at the Thames Shipyard through mid-July.

Resuming school duties on 17 July, G-3 spent the next three months conducting torpedo instruction, listening and radio training for officer and enlisted submarine students. Following an engineering performance cruise to Boston, Massachusetts, in September, the boat conducted training operations through October. On 10 November, G-3 began preparations for an overhaul at the Submarine Base, New London, which lasted through April 1920. Although she returned to her familiar training and instruction duties in May, the boat was tapped for inactivation on 6 December.

G-3 was decommissioned at New London on 5 May 1921 and towed to the Philadelphia Navy Yard on 17 August. Having been stripped of machinery and fittings, the hulk was sold for scrap to Joseph G. Hitner on 19 April 1922 and struck from the Naval Vessel Register that same day.

References

External links

United States G-class submarines
World War I submarines of the United States
Ships built in Bridgeport, Connecticut
1913 ships